Candice Renoir is a French crime television series created by Solen Roy-Pagenault, Robin Barataud and Brigitte Peskine and is aired since 19 April 2013 on France 2.

Plot
Candice Renoir is a mother of four children. She has taken a ten-year leave of absence from her job as a police detective in Paris and has spent this time as a stay-at-home mom, traveling with the family for her husband's jobs in, among others, the United States, Mexico and Singapore. After her marriage fails due to her husband's infidelity, Candice resumes her job as an investigator. She has called in favors and has landed the job of chief of the small BSU (Urban Security Brigade (Brigade de Sûreté Urbaine), criminal investigations division) of the Police Commissariat in Sète (Hérault), a Mediterranean seaside resort suburb of Montpellier. From the moment she arrives at the Police in Sète she is at odds with the local chief of police Commissary Yasmine Attia, as Candice's appointment was forced from the Police HQ in Paris, but also with Police Captain Dumas. Attia had  promised Dumas the position of chief of the BSU and he acted in this assignment for a month, before Major Renoir's arrival sidelined him, relegating Dumas back to deputy, much to the frustration of the rest of the team. Renoir's ten-year career gap has left some gaps in her knowledge of more recent police procedures, which initially lands her in trouble. In addition her bubbly personality and soft, at times motherly behavior, unconventional for a criminal police detective, makes her subordinates call her 'Barbie doll' behind her back, but her unique approach brings results and quickly earns her their respect.

Cast
Some officer ranks of the French National Police are styled after the French Army, but are unrelated as the employees are civil servants. To underline the difference these are sometimes translated into English as Police Major, Police Captain, Police Lieutenant (or alternatively Major of Police, Captain of Police, Lieutenant of Police) etc.
 Cécile Bois: Candice Renoir, Police Major (Commandant de Police) and a mother of four children, who experiences family and work troubles along her way.
 Raphaël Lenglet: Antoine Dumas, Police Captain (Capitaine de Police), who turned Police Commissary (Commissaire de Police) in Season 6. 
 Clara Antoons: Emma Renoir, Candice’s eldest daughter
 Etienne Martinelli: Jules Renoir, Candice’s eldest son
 Alexandre Ruscher: Léo Renoir, a son of Candice, who is also a twin of Martin
 Paul Ruscher: Martin Renoir, a son of Candice and a twin of Léo
 Aude Forget: Laurette (season 1), Candice’s housekeeper
 Alix Poisson: Pascale Ibarruri (seasons 1–2), head of Forensic Identity squad
 Arnaud Giovaninetti: Laurent Renoir (seasons 1–2; guest, season 6), Candice’s first husband, in divorce
 Alexandre Varga: Hervé Mazzani (seasons 1–2; guest, season 5), Candice’s first boyfriend after a divorce with Laurent
 Mhamed Arezki: Jean-Baptiste Medjaoui (seasons 1–2; guest, season 3), Police Sergeant Major
 Samira Lachhab: Yasmine Attia (seasons 1–3) Police Commissary
 Gaya Verneuil: Chrystelle Da Silva (seasons 1–5), Police Lieutenant (Lieutenant de Police)
 Stéphane Blancafort: David Canovas (seasons 2–4; guest, season 5), Police Major and a member of BRI. He and Candice had a relationship before his death in season 4
 Delphine Rich: Aline Jego (seasons 2–5), a leader of Forensic Identity squad, who succeeded and replaced Ibarruri
 Ali Marhyar: Mehdi Badhou (season 3–present), Police Sergeant Major (Brigadier-Chef de Police)
 Nathalie Boutefeu: Sylvie Leclerc (season 4–present), Police Major, turned Police Commissary in late season 4
 Olivier Cabassut: Armand Marquez (seasons 3–4, 7–present), Police Lieutenant, from Season 7 Police Captain
 Yeelem Jappain: Valentine Atger (season 5–present), Police Lieutenant
 Benjamin Baroche: Max Francazal (seasons 5–7), Candice's second husband, in divorse
 François-Dominique Blin: Franck Davenne (season 6), Police Captain Major (Brigadier-Chef de Police)
 Christopfer Ntakabanyura: Ismael Ndongo (guest, season 8; main, season 9–present), Police Lieutenaunt

Episodes

Series overview

International broadcasts
In 2020 Polish commercial television channel Polsat started production of their own version of "Candice Renoir" called "Komisarz Mama".

See also
List of French television series

References

External links
 

2013 French television series debuts
French-language television shows
France Télévisions crime television series
French police procedural television series